On 7 August 2019, 18-year-old yeshiva student Dvir Sorek was stabbed to death near the Israeli settlement of Migdal Oz.

Incident
Sorek was an 18-year-old Yeshiva student, was traveling alone from his yeshiva (named Machanayim) to Jerusalem to buy books for his rabbis as a gift for the end of the school year. He was apparently attacked on his way back, by (it was believed) two assailants, near a bus stop. Despite initially believing that his death was a kidnapping, Israeli security forces came to the conclusion that Soreks' death was a premeditated murder.

Two Palestinian men, 24-year-old Nazir Saleh Khalil Atafra and 30-year-old Qasem Araf Khalil Atafra, were arrested for the murder. Their houses were demolished.

Funeral
His funeral was held in Ofra, where Sorek’s family resided, the next day and thousands of people attended. Sorek’s father performed the eulogy. The funeral was interrupted by Palestinian fireworks and celebrations in the neighboring town of Silwad.

Reactions

International reactions
 The United Nations peace envoy, Nickolay Mladenov, called the killing a "dangerous act."
 The United Kingdom ambassador to Israel, Neil Wigan, hoped that the killers would "be brought to justice."

Palestinian reactions 
 Palestinian students at Birzeit University near Ramallah celebrated the murder of the teenager by handing out free Snickers and other candy and fliers to other students. A Palestinian source shared photos of the celebration at the university, captioned Members of the Islamic bloc at Birzeit University distribute sweets on the occasion of Eid al-Adha and rejoicing in the shahada that killed an Israeli soldier.

Aftermath
Two Palestinians accused of the murder were captured by Israeli soldiers in the village of Beit Kahil outside Hebron. The suspects were identified as 24-year-old Nazir Saleh Khalil Atafra, a Hamas activist, and 30-year-old Qasem Araf Khalil Atafra.

See also 
 List of terrorist incidents in August 2019
 Murder of Ori Ansbacher (February 2019)
 Murder of Rina Shnerb (23 August 2019)

References 

2019 murders in Asia
Palestinian terrorism
Terrorist incidents in the West Bank in 2019
Stabbing attacks in 2019
Terrorist incidents involving knife attacks
Violence against men in Asia